Mayrimunia is a genus of small seed-eating birds in the family Estrildidae that are endemic to New Guinea.

The genus was introduced in 1949 by the German ornithologist Hans Edmund Wolters with the streak-headed mannikin as the type species. The name was chosen to honour the evolutionary biologist Ernst Mayr and combines his name with the genus Munia.

The two species now placed in genus were formerly placed in the genus Lonchura. They were moved to this resurrected genus based on a molecular phylogenetic study published in 2020.

Species
The genus contains two species:

 Streak-headed mannikin (Mayrimunia tristissima) – New Guinea
 White-spotted mannikin (Mayrimunia cinereovinacea) – New Guinea

References

 
Bird genera